Pulau Sudong is a 209-hectare coral island off the southern coast of Singapore. It was enlarged through a land reclamation process during the late 1970s.

Restricted area
Since the early 1980s, Pulau Sudong, together with Pulau Senang and Pulau Pawai, have formed the Singapore Armed Forces southern islands military training area and live-firing zone. As with all other military installations in Singapore, the entire live-firing zone is strictly off limits to all civilians at all times of the day and night. The only exceptions to this are for workers who are contracted by MINDEF to perform maintenance on the island's area calibration facilities.

The island's airport and dock are maintained by SAF, with most areas covered by dense vegetation - the island is a wildlife haven for migratory birds and plants alike. The airstrip is only utilised for emergencies involving military aircraft.

Etymology and history
Sudong is the same as tudong in Malay, a cone-shaped food cover made from matting; it is also used as head covers by padi planters.

The government malaria research station, originally on Pulau Belakang Mati, was on the island.

In 2015, the former island inhabitants petitioned to be allowed back to the island for a day to fulfill their dying wish. However their request was denied.

Panoramic image

References

Sources
Victor R Savage, Brenda S A Yeoh (2004), Toponymics - A Study of Singapore Street Names, Eastern University Press,

External links
Satellite image of Pulau Sudong - Google Maps

Sudong
Sudong
Sudong
Sudong
Western Islands Planning Area